Kyra Jefferson (born September 23, 1994) is an American professional sprinter. She competed for the University of Florida through 2017 before receiving a Nike sponsorship. She won a silver medal at the 2015 Pan American Games in the 200m and a gold in the 4x400m relay.

At the 2017 NCAA Women's Division I Outdoor Track and Field Championships, she defeated pre-race favorite and Olympian Deajah Stevens of Oregon to break the American collegiate record in the 200m with a time of 22.02 seconds.

Major international competitions

Domestic competitions

References 

Living people
1994 births
American female sprinters
Pan American Games gold medalists for the United States
African-American female track and field athletes
Pan American Games silver medalists for the United States
Athletes (track and field) at the 2015 Pan American Games
Pan American Games track and field athletes for the United States
Florida Gators women's track and field athletes
Pan American Games medalists in athletics (track and field)
Medalists at the 2015 Pan American Games
21st-century African-American sportspeople
21st-century African-American women